Matthiew José Araya González (born 12 July 2006) is a Costa Rican professional footballer who currently plays as a defender for Municipal Grecia.

Career statistics

Club

Notes

References

2006 births
Living people
Costa Rican footballers
Association football defenders
Municipal Grecia players
Liga FPD players